Gerard "Jerry" John Ebert (born June 21, 1953) is an American author, musician, and union organizer.

Personal life

Jerry Ebert is the third oldest of twelve children, including actor Matthew Ebert. A lifelong union organizer, Ebert started attending Union Meetings with his father, Raymond Ebert (former Secretary-Treasurer of Teamsters Local 445), at age 10. It was there that he met famed labor leader Jimmy Hoffa, and began helping his father organize Wakefern Foods and St. Luke's Hospital workers in Newburgh, New York.

Union work

Jerry worked as a union organizer and business agent for Local 445 of the International Brotherhood of Teamsters and the Professional Workers Association. As an organizer for the Professional Workers Association, or PWA, Ebert successfully organized 11 Roman Catholic high schools in New York City. It was during this campaign that he claims he ran afoul of Cardinal John O'Connor, former American prelate of the Catholic Church. With Teamsters Local 445, Ebert also successfully organized the Dutchess County Public Transit workers,  Sullivan County Workers, UNFI truck drivers, along with others.

Music & literature

Jerry currently creates a music and book subscription via his website, where he has a series of 19 songs that coincide with his 3 books of poems. He has performed  with lifelong friend Pete Seeger at labor rallies.

References 

1953 births
Living people
American trade unionists